Headquartered in Hermantown, Minnesota, Voyageurs Area Council serves Scouts in Minnesota, Wisconsin, and Michigan. The Ka'niss Ma'ingan Lodge is the local Order of the Arrow Lodge for Voyageurs Area Council.

Organization
Voyageurs Area Council has a staff of nine people.

The Council Executive Board through officers are the governing body of the council territory. The board takes action to achieve the purposes of the local council. It establishes the council program, carries out resolutions, establishes and enforces policy and hires a Scout Executive.

The council's geographic territory includes 13 counties in Minnesota, three counties in Wisconsin, and one county in the Upper Peninsula of Michigan. The council is divided into four administrative districts.

History
Voyageurs Area Council is the successor to the former Lake Superior Council and the Headwaters Area Council.

The Ashland Council was formed in 1918. It disbanded in 1920. In 1959, Lake Superior Council was formed from a merger of the North Star Council (northeastern Minnesota) and the Gitchee Gumee Council (northwestern Wisconsin and part of the Upper Peninsula of Michigan). In 1994, Lake Superior Council merged with the Headwaters Area Council, headquartered in Hibbing, MN, to become the Voyageurs Area Council.  Each of those councils had been formed by previous mergers, as depicted below.

Camps

Camp Horace Johnson
Camp Horace Johnson is a  wooded area on Island Lake,  North of Duluth on St. Louis County Road #4 (Rice Lake Road). Thirty people can be accommodated in the Lodge.

Camp Barksdale
Camp Barksdale is a  wooded area along the south shore of Lake Superior. The entrance is located along State Highway 13, in between Washburn, WI and Ashland, WI. It is used to accommodate Scouting activities throughout the year.

Camp Nushka

The lake can be used for canoeing, fishing, and other water activities.

Order of the Arrow

Ka'niss Ma'ingan Lodge #196 serves youth in Voyageurs Area Council. The Lodge totem is the wolf, which is featured on the lodge pocket flap patch.

The Lodge was formed in 1995 by the merger of Mesabi Lodge (formerly called Little Bear Lodge) and Nahak Lodge #526. Previous to this merger, Nahak Lodge had absorbed Nagadjiwanang Lodge #174 when two councils merged in 1959.

The leadership of Ka'niss Ma'ingan includes the members of the Lodge Executive Committee. The Committee meets monthly at the council service center, and is composed of the Lodge Chief and all the Lodge officers.

The lodge's main annual events include Winter Banquet, Spring Conclave, Fall Conclave, and Section Conclave. The lodge also holds an annual training event called Lodge Leadership Development (LLD) Training. The course covers topics such as Event Planning, Using Lodge Resources and Talent, Time Management and planning a Service Project.

The Lodge is part of the Order of the Arrow Section C-1A. Currently, one of the three Section C-1A officers are from Ka'niss Ma'Ingan Lodge. Other lodges in Section C-1A include: Naguonabe Lodge (Central Minnesota Council), Pa-hin Lodge (Northern Lights Council), Tetonwana Lodge (Sioux Council), Totanhan Nakaha Lodge (Northern Star Council), and Wahpekute Lodge (Twin Valley Council).

See also
 Scouting in Michigan
 Scouting in Minnesota
 Scouting in Wisconsin

References

Local councils of the Boy Scouts of America
Central Region (Boy Scouts of America)
Youth organizations based in Minnesota